Camponotus simoni is a species of carpenter ant (genus Camponotus). It is found from Sri Lanka.

References

External links

 at antwiki.org

simoni
Hymenoptera of Asia
Insects described in 1893